The 2009 Country Music Association Awards, 43rd Annual Ceremony, was held on November 11, 2009, at the Sommet Center (later the Bridgestone Arena) in Nashville, Tennessee and was hosted by Brad Paisley and Carrie Underwood for the second time. Taylor Swift became the youngest person in CMA history to be nominated for and win Entertainer of the Year.

Winners and nominees
Winners are shown in Bold.

Performers

Presenters

References 

Country Music Association
CMA
Country Music Association Awards
Country Music Association Awards
November 2009 events in the United States
2009 awards in the United States
21st century in Nashville, Tennessee
Events in Nashville, Tennessee